The 1940 United States presidential election in Pennsylvania took place on November 5, 1940 as part of the 1940 United States presidential election. Voters chose 36 representatives, or electors to the Electoral College, who voted for president and vice president.

Pennsylvania voted to give Democratic nominee, President Franklin D. Roosevelt an unprecedented third term, over the Republican nominee, corporate lawyer Wendell Willkie, a dark horse candidate who had never before run for a political office. Roosevelt won Pennsylvania by a margin of 6.9%. This was the last election until 1976 that Pennsylvania voted for a different candidate than Michigan.

Results

Results by county

See also
 List of United States presidential elections in Pennsylvania

References

Pennsylvania
1940
1940 Pennsylvania elections